The 2012 Money in the Bank was the third annual Money in the Bank professional wrestling pay-per-view (PPV) event produced by WWE. The event took place on July 15, 2012, at the US Airways Center in Phoenix, Arizona. It was the first Money in the Bank event held following the discontinuation of the first brand extension in August 2011. The event had 188,000 buys, slightly down on the 2011 Money in the Bank figure of 195,000 buys.

Eight matches were contested at the event, with one match on the pre-show. In the main event, John Cena won the Money in the Bank ladder match for a WWE Championship match contract, while in the opening bout, Dolph Ziggler won the other Money in the Bank ladder match for a World Heavyweight Championship match contract. In other prominent matches, Sheamus defeated Alberto Del Rio to retain the World Heavyweight Championship and CM Punk defeated Daniel Bryan to retain the WWE Championship in a no disqualification match with AJ Lee as the special guest referee.

Production

Background
Money in the Bank is an annual gimmick pay-per-view (PPV) produced by WWE since 2010, held in July. The concept of the show comes from WWE's established Money in the Bank ladder match, in which multiple wrestlers use ladders to retrieve a briefcase hanging above the ring. The briefcase contains a contract that guarantees the winner a match for a world championship at any time within the next year. For 2012, two Money in the Bank ladder matches occurred; one granted a contract for a WWE Championship match while the other contained a World Heavyweight Championship match contract. The 2012 event was the third event under the Money in the Bank chronology and the first since the end of the first brand split in August 2011. It took place on July 15, 2012, at the US Airways Center in Phoenix, Arizona.

Storylines
Money in the Bank featured seven professional wrestling matches that involved different wrestlers from pre-existing feuds or and storylines that played out on WWE's primary television programs. Wrestlers portrayed villains or heroes as they followed a series of events that built tension and culminated in a wrestling match or series of matches.

On the June 25 episode of Raw, Vickie Guerrero announced that only previous WWE Champions may participate in the Money in the Bank Ladder Match for the WWE Championship contract. The four participants announced were Kane, Chris Jericho, Big Show and John Cena. Earlier, during the pay-per-view, The Miz would return from filming The Marine 3: Homefront and announced that he would insert himself in the match.

On the June 29 episode of SmackDown, qualifying matches were held for the Money in the Bank Ladder Match for the World Heavyweight Championship contract.  In those matches, Damien Sandow defeated Zack Ryder, Tyson Kidd defeated Jack Swagger, Santino Marella and Christian defeated Cody Rhodes and David Otunga in a tag team match and Tensai defeated Justin Gabriel.  On the July 3 "Great American Bash" edition of SmackDown, Rhodes defeated Christian and Dolph Ziggler defeated Alex Riley in two additional qualifying matches. The final qualifying match took place on the July 9 episode of Raw in which Sin Cara defeated Heath Slater.

In addition, there was a rivalry involving CM Punk and Daniel Bryan for Punk's WWE Championship. In his reign as WWE Champion, he had successfully defended his title against several contenders, and had defeated Bryan in several pay-per-views, the last one also involving Kane. At the same time, Bryan's ex-girlfriend AJ had taken a liking towards Punk and Kane and had also rekindled her interest in Bryan, but Punk and Kane believed that she was unstable due to Bryan breaking up with AJ. Following No Way Out, Bryan defeated Punk and Kane to earn his rematch against Punk at Money in the Bank. Weeks later, AJ was named special guest referee. Right before the pay-per-view began, WWE.com posted that the no disqualification stipulation was added.

Event

Preliminary matches
The actual pay-per-view opened with the Money in the Bank Ladder Match for a World Heavyweight Championship contract involving Damien Sandow, Tensai, Intercontinental Champion Christian, United States Champion Santino Marella, Tyson Kidd, Dolph Ziggler, Cody Rhodes and Sin Cara. In the end, Christian attempted to retrieve the briefcase, but Ziggler struck Christian with a ladder, causing Christian to fall off the ladder, and retrieved the briefcase.

Then, The Miz returned and announced his entry in the WWE Championship Money in the Bank ladder match.

Next, Sheamus defended the World Heavyweight Championship against Alberto Del Rio. During the match, Del Rio repeatedly targeted Sheamus' left shoulder after Sheamus collided with the ring post. In the end, Sheamus was able to execute White Noise and a Brogue Kick to retain the title. After the match, Del Rio and his ring announcer Ricardo Rodriguez attacked Sheamus. Dolph Ziggler, who won the Money In The Bank earlier that night, attempted to cash it in until a distraction by Del Rio. Sheamus would give Ziggler a Brogue Kick and leave with the World Heavyweight Championship, as the match never got started.

After that, The Prime Time Players faced Primo & Epico. WWE Tag Team Champions Kofi Kingston and R-Truth were at ringside providing commentary for the match. Primo pinned Young with a roll up for the win.

In the fourth match, CM Punk defended the WWE Championship against Daniel Bryan in a no disqualification match with AJ serving as the special guest referee. During the match, Punk accidentally knocked AJ down. Bryan took advantage of the situation and made it appear that he was concerned about her health when she was escorted to the back of the arena. While AJ was away, Bryan targeted Punk's ribs using a kendo stick. Punk attempted a Go To Sleep twice, but Bryan countered each time. Bryan applied a surfboard, but Punk escaped by striking Bryan with the kendo stick. AJ returned to the ring and made the second referee return backstage. She brought a chair into the ring, which Bryan struck Punk with for several near-falls. Bryan tried to coax AJ, allowing Punk to roll him up for a near-fall. Punk set the chair up in the corner and before he could send Bryan into the chair, AJ stood in the way, allowing  Bryan to gain the advantage. However, as Bryan went to retrieve the kendo stick, she stood on it, allowing Punk to execute a scoop slam with the chair. Punk attempted a diving elbow drop with the chair, but missed and fell on the chair. Bryan applied the Yes Lock using the kendo stick but Punk fought out and performed a GTS for a near-fall. Punk executed a back superplex through a table on Bryan to retain the title.

Later, Ryback faced Curt Hawkins and Tyler Reks in a handicap match. Ryback executed Shell Shocked on Reks to win the match.

After that, Layla, Kaitlyn, and Tamina Snuka faced Beth Phoenix, Natalya, and Eve in a six-diva tag team match. When the referee lost control of the match, Tamina performed a superkick on Phoenix. Layla performed The Layout on Phoenix for the victory.

Main event
The main event was the Money in the Bank Ladder match for a WWE Championship contract involving John Cena, Big Show, Chris Jericho, Kane and The Miz. Cena performed an Attitude Adjustment on Big Show through a broadcast table and then the other wrestlers buried Big Show under several ladders. Cena performed an Attitude Adjustment on Kane on top of The Miz, who was lying on a ladder, but Jericho struck Cena with a ladder. As Jericho was about to retrieve the briefcase, Big Show destroyed the ladder with one hand. Big Show destroyed every ladder in the ring and then retrieved a super-sized ladder. Kane and Big Show fought atop the ladder, but Big Show knocked Kane and Cena off of the ladder. Jericho struck Big Show with a chair, causing Big Show to fall. Jericho applied a sleeper hold to Cena atop the ladder. After Cena fell, Jericho almost retrieved the briefcase, but The Miz climbed the other side of the ladder. Big Show climbed up the ladder and attacked Jericho and The Miz with KO Punches. Big Show attempted a KO Punch on Cena, but Cena blocked it with the briefcase and struck Big Show with it. During this, the handle of the briefcase broke off, meaning Cena won the match. Cena then knocked Big Show off the ladder.

Reception
Money in the Bank received generally positive reviews. Adam Testa of The Baltimore Sun called the pay-per-view "Strong, if unspectacular"; they praised the WWE title match calling it a "fun ride" and that "The no disqualification stipulation really added to the contest". Both Money In The Bank matches were well received. Colin Rinehart of 411Mania awarded the pay-per-view a 7.8/10 calling it 'good'. The WWE title match received 4.25 stars, the World Heavyweight Championship Money in the Bank ladder match received 4 stars, and the WWE Championship Money in the Bank ladder match received 3.75 stars, according to Dave Meltzer.

Aftermath
On July 23, 2012, during Raw 1000, John Cena cashed in his Money in the Bank on CM Punk by having a singles match with him, becoming only the second wrestler (Rob Van Dam being the first) to announce his intention prior to cashing in. Cena won the match via disqualification thus not winning the title after Big Show interfered. This made John Cena the first of five wrestlers (as of ) to officially cash in the contract and not win the championship, the others being Damien Sandow in October 2013, Baron Corbin in August 2017, Braun Strowman in September 2018, and Austin Theory in November 2022 (in Theory's case, he was the first person to cash in the contract on a non-world title, that being the United States Championship).

Meanwhile, Dolph Ziggler attempted various times to cash in the contract following Money in the Bank including four times on SmackDown against Sheamus and Big Show when they were champions respectively and on two episodes of Raw attempted to cash in, being thwarted by John Cena and Ricardo Rodriguez respectively. Ziggler defended the briefcase twice, on the August 20 episode of Raw to Chris Jericho and at TLC to Cena in a ladder match. Ziggler finally cashed in the contract, defeating Alberto Del Rio on the April 8, 2013 episode of Raw, after Del Rio had been attacked by Jack Swagger.

The feud between Sheamus and Alberto Del Rio continued into SummerSlam, where Sheamus "beat" Del Rio. After Sheamus attacked Ricardo Rodriguez, Del Rio sought David Otunga to ban the Brogue Kick. This was granted by SmackDown general manager Booker T. The ban was lifted at Night of Champions, where Sheamus won.

Also, at Raw 1000, CM Punk turned heel after attacking The Rock, who was helping John Cena fend off Big Show. At SummerSlam, Punk defended the WWE Championship against Cena and Show in a Triple Threat Match and at Night of Champions against Cena, where the match ended in a draw. Punk would continue to defend the WWE Championship until the 2013 Royal Rumble, where, despite interference from The Shield, The Rock would defeat him for it.

Results

References

External links
Official Money in the Bank website
Money in the Bank Event Site

2012 in Arizona
Events in Phoenix, Arizona
2012
Professional wrestling in Phoenix, Arizona
2012 WWE pay-per-view events
July 2012 events in the United States